The Wilson Road Synagogue was the largest synagogue in Sheffield in England for much of the twentieth-century.

Sheffield had a Jewish population from the 1780s, and its first synagogue was built in 1851 on Fig Tree Lane in the city centre.  However, communal disputes led to a second congregation being established on North Church Street in 1914.  This group constructed a synagogue on Wilson Road, near Hunters Bar, in 1930.

The building was designed by Mansell Jenkinson in a classical style, featuring a portico in the Doric order.  It is built of brick, with faience dressings, and also has notable internal features, including a granite ark, choir gallery and hardwood pews.  The sukkah is in a neighbouring building, designed so that its flat roof can be slid open.

During World War II, the city centre synagogue was destroyed by bombing, and much of its community came to worship at Wilson Road.  However, they later established a new building, Kingfield Hall, in Nether Edge.  The Jewish population of the city reached about 1,500 in the 1950s, but then entered a long decline.  In the 1960s, the two communities joined together, and in 2000, the resulting independent congregation moved to a new building at the Kingfield Hall site.  The Wilson Road Synagogue was subsequently converted into a church.

Both synagogue and sukkah were listed at grade II in 1992, along with the boundary wall and gates.

References

Synagogues completed in 1930
Former synagogues in England
Grade II listed buildings in Sheffield
Grade II listed religious buildings and structures
Neoclassical synagogues
Religious buildings and structures in Sheffield